Łuszczyn  is a settlement in the administrative district of Gmina Rzeczenica, within Człuchów County, Pomeranian Voivodeship, in northern Poland.

The settlement has a population of 32.

See also 
 History of Pomerania

References 

Villages in Człuchów County